Sky Airlines was an airline which operated chartered flights. It was based in Antalya, Turkey, operating on behalf of tour operators on short and medium haul routes into Turkey.

History
The company was established in 2000 and started operations in 2001. It was wholly owned by Kayi Group. In 2010, the airline started scheduled domestic operations in Turkey making it the 9th airline to enter the domestic market. It downsized operations for the winter season 2012–13, returning three Boeing 737-800s to their lessors.

A subsidiary, German Sky Airlines, based in Düsseldorf, was launched in 2010. On 1 December 2012 it announced a suspension of services (due to the economic downturn) and returned two Boeing 737-800s to their lessors. The airline hoped to resume services in Spring 2013.

On 4 June 2013, the airline filed for bankruptcy and ceased all flight operations with immediate effect.

Destinations 

The airline also operated scheduled services to the following (as of December 2012)

Albania
 Tirana International Airport
Austria
 Graz Airport  
 Linz Airport
 Salzburg Airport
 Vienna International Airport
Belgium
 Brussels Airport
Bosnia and Herzegovina
 Tuzla International Airport
Bulgaria
 Sofia Airport
Czech
Prague – Václav Havel Airport
Denmark
 Copenhagen Airport
Estonia
Tallinn – Lennart Meri Tallinn Airport
France
 Lyon-Saint Exupéry Airport
 Marseille Provence Airport
Mulhouse – EuroAirport Basel-Mulhouse-Freiburg
Germany
Berlin – Schönefeld Airport
Cologne/Bonn – Cologne Bonn Airport
 Dortmund Airport
 Düsseldorf Airport
 Erfurt-Weimar Airport
 Frankfurt Airport
 Frankfurt-Hahn Airport
 Hamburg Airport
 Hannover-Langenhagen Airport
Karlsruhe/Baden-Baden – Baden Airpark
Leipzig/Halle – Leipzig/Halle Airport
 Munich Airport
Münster/Osnabrück – Münster Osnabrück International Airport
 Nuremberg Airport
 Paderborn Lippstadt Airport
 Saarbrücken Airport
 Stuttgart Airport
 Zweibrücken Airport
Iran
Tehran – Imam Khomeini International Airport
Kazakhstan
 Almaty International Airport
 Aktobe Airport
Karaganda – Sary-Arka Airport
Republic of Macedonia
 Skopje "Alexander the Great" Airport
Netherlands
 Amsterdam Airport Schiphol
 Eindhoven Airport
Poland
 Bydgoszcz Ignacy Jan Paderewski Airport
 Katowice International Airport
 Warsaw Chopin Airport
 Copernicus Airport Wrocław
Norway
 Oslo Gardermoen Airport
Trondheim – Trondheim Airport, Vaernes
Romania
Bucharest – Henri Coandă International Airport
 Cluj-Napoca International Airport
Timișoara – Traian Vuia International Airport
Slovakia
Bratislava – M. R. Štefánik Airport
Slovenia
Ljubljana – Ljubljana Jože Pučnik Airport
Switzerland
 Zürich Airport
Turkey
 Adana Şakirpaşa Airport
 Antalya Airport Hub
Bodrum – Milas–Bodrum Airport Secondary hub
 Dalaman Airport Secondary hub
 Diyarbakır Airport
 Erzincan Airport
 Erzurum Airport
Gaziantep – Oğuzeli Airport
Istanbul – Sabiha Gökçen International Airport
İzmir – Adnan Menderes Airport
Kayseri – Erkilet International Airport
 Malatya Erhaç Airport
 Samsun-Çarşamba Airport
 Trabzon Airport
Van – Van Ferit Melen Airport

Fleet 
As of February 2013, the Sky Airlines fleet consists of the following aircraft, which are all equipped with an all-economy class cabin layout:

References

External links 

Defunct airlines of Turkey
Turkish brands
Airlines established in 2000
Airlines disestablished in 2013
Defunct charter airlines of Turkey
Defunct charter airlines
Turkish companies established in 2000
2013 disestablishments in Turkey
Companies based in Antalya